Korean as a foreign language is the study of the Korean language by anyone who is not a native speaker, regardless of Korean ethnicity.

In Korea

University-level education includes: Yonsei University Korean Language Institute, Myongji University Korean Language Institute, Seoul National University Korean Language Education Center, Sogang University Korean Language Education Center, Busan University of Foreign Studies, and Language Education Institute of Pusan National University.

International organizations
The International Association for Korean Language Education, founded in 1985, is the world's largest organization of Korean language teachers, with over 1,200 members. Its first president was Fred Lukoff of the University of Washington.

Government support
King Sejong Institute is the brand name of Korean-language institutes established by the South Korean government around the world since 2007. The institute's name refers to Sejong the Great, the inventor of the Korean alphabet. As of June 2021, there were 234 King Sejong Institutes in 82 countries.

Testing
The Test of Proficiency in Korean (TOPIK)  was introduced by the South Korean government in 1997 and conducted by a branch of the Ministry of Education of the country. The test is offered six times annually (Jan, Apr, May, Jul, Oct, Nov) within South Korea and less often to people studying Korean in other countries. The test is for individuals whose first language is not Korean and is taken by overseas ethnic Koreans, those wishing to study at a Korean university, and for those who want to be employed at Korean companies in and outside of Korea. Since 2011, TOPIK is administered by the National Institute for International Education (국립국제교육원, NIIED), a branch of the Ministry of Education in South Korea.

The Korean Language Ability Test, ( KLAT)  is offered by the Korean Language Society and is a major alternative to Test of Proficiency in Korean (TOPIK).

References

External links
 International Association for Korean Language Education
Sogang KLEC homepage

See also
Japanese as a foreign language
Chinese as a foreign language

Korean-language education